Hamish Northcott (born 6 August 1992) is a New Zealand rugby union player who currently plays as a second five-eighth for  in the Mitre 10 Cup.

Career

A product of Feilding High School, Northcott followed a well walked path into the Manawatu Turbos Mitre 10 Cup team.

He debuted for Manawatu in the 2012 season making only one appearance and then played four times the following year. In 2014 he finally nailed down a place as a starter and was a key member of the Turbos side which finished top of the ITM Cup Championship division.

Northcott has also been a member of the  development side.

Some strong performances in the Turbos midfield during 2014 earned him a Super Rugby contract with the Blues for 2015 coached by Sir John Kirwan. He played four games at Centre, one at 2nd 5/8 and was a substitute in his other game. He was in the first three games of the season (against the Chiefs, Stormers and Cheetahs) before Charles Piutau was moved from Fullback to Centre. However, Francis Saili and George Moala were the preferred mid-field combination and played most of the season's games. Northcott played the last two games at Centre against the Crusaders and Highlanders.  However, the Blues did not sign Northcott for the 2016 season.

Although not appearing again at Super Rugby level he continued to be a regular starting player for the Manawatu team.

In July 2020 Northcott reached 100 games in the Manawatu Senior A competition for his club (Massey) University.

Northcott has also played for the New Zealand Universities rugby team.

He worked on a Pahiatua sheep-and-beef farm and coached juniors in Rippa rugby.

References

1992 births
Living people
New Zealand rugby union players
Rugby union centres
Manawatu rugby union players
Blues (Super Rugby) players
People from Feilding
Rugby union players from Manawatū-Whanganui